Burton's yellow-shouldered bat (Sturnira burtonlimi) is a species of leaf-nosed bat found in Panama and Costa Rica.

Taxonomy and etymology
It was described as a new species in 2014.
The holotype had been collected in March 1995 by Burton K. Lim, who is the eponym for the species name "burtonlimi."
Of Lim, Velazco and Patterson wrote that he "is a tireless fieldworker whose research has contributed much to our understanding of the diversity, relationships, and biogeography of tropical mammals."

Description
The fur on its back is dark brown, with individual hairs banded with four colors.
The first band, closest to the body, is pale gray.
The second is dark gray, the third is, again, pale gray, and the tip is dark brown.
The fur on its belly is also dark brown, though individual hairs are tricolored.

Range and habitat
An additional specimen was later reported from the Cartago Province of Costa Rica.
All specimens were collected from premontane forest near coffee plantations.

Conservation
As of 2017, it is evaluated as a data deficient species by the IUCN.
It meets the criteria for this classification because there is a lack of available information on this species.
The extent of its geographic range and the size of its population are unknown.

References

Sturnira
Mammals described in 2014
Bats of Central America